Măxineni is a commune located in Brăila County, Muntenia, Romania. It is composed of five villages: Corbu Nou, Corbu Vechi, Latinu, Măxineni and Voinești.

References

Communes in Brăila County
Localities in Muntenia